Greenways Road is a railway station on the Chennai MRTS. Located on Greenways Road, it exclusively serves the Chennai MRTS.

History
Greenways Road station was opened on 26 January 2004, as part of the second phase of the Chennai MRTS network.

Structure
The elevated station is built on the eastern bank of Buckingham Canal adjacent to the junction of the Buckingham Canal with Adyar River. Like most other stations along the Chennai MRTS route, Greenways Road features 2 side platforms, which the length of each platform being 280 metres. The station building consists of 3,300 sq m of parking area in its basement.

Service and connections
Greenways Road is the tenth station on the MRTS line to Velachery. In the return direction from Velachery, it is currently the eight station towards Chennai Beach station.

See also
 Chennai MRTS
 Chennai suburban railway
 Chennai Metro
 Transport in Chennai

References

Chennai Mass Rapid Transit System stations
Railway stations in Chennai
Railway stations opened in 2004